Maverick a Strike is the debut studio album by Scottish musician Finley Quaye. It was released on 6 August 1997 through 550 Music and Epic Records. The album spawned five singles: "Sunday Shining", "Even After All", "It's Great When We're Together", "Your Love Gets Sweeter", and "Ultra Stimulation", all of which charted on the UK Singles Chart. The album peaked at number three on the UK Albums Chart. The album has been certified double platinum by the British Phonographic Industry.

Track listing
All tracks written by Finley Quaye, except where noted.

Personnel
Credits adapted from album's liner notes.

Finley Quaye – vocals, producer
Kevin Bacon – co-producer
Jonathan Quarmby - co-producer

Charts

Weekly charts

|-
! scope="row"| Australian Albums (ARIA)
| 77
|-

|-

|-

|-

|-

|-

|}

Year-end charts

! scope="row"| UK Albums (OCC)
| 54
|}

!scope="row"| New Zealand Albums (RMNZ)
| style="text-align:center;"|47
|-
! scope="row"| UK Albums (OCC)
| 39
|}

Certifications

References

1997 debut albums
Epic Records albums
550 Music albums
Albums produced by Kevin Bacon (producer)